Crockard may refer to:

 Crockard, an English surname
 Crockard, a coin minted in Europe as counterfeit English pennies during the reign of Edward I